Keynsham is a town and civil parish located between Bristol and Bath in Somerset, England. It has a population of 19,000.
It was listed in the Domesday Book as Cainesham (as it is pronounced), which is believed to mean the home of Saint Keyne.

The site of the town has been occupied since prehistoric times, and may have been the site of the Roman settlement of Trajectus. The remains of at least two  Roman villas have been excavated, and an additional 15 Roman buildings have been detected beneath the Keynsham Hams. Keynsham developed into a medieval market town after Keynsham Abbey was founded around 1170. It is situated at the confluence of the River Chew and River Avon and was subject to serious flooding before the creation of Chew Valley Lake and river level controls at Keynsham Lock in 1727. The Chew Stoke flood of 1968 inundated large parts of the town. It was home to the Cadbury's chocolate factory, Somerdale, which opened in 1935 as a major employer in the town.

It is home to Memorial Park, which is used for the annual town festival and several nature reserves. The town is served by Keynsham railway station on the London-Bristol and Bristol-Southampton trunk routes and is close to the A4 road which bypassed the town in 1964. There are schools, religious, sporting, and cultural clubs and venues.

History

Roman Trajectus

Evidence of occupation dates back to prehistoric times, and during the Roman period, Keynsham may have been the site of the Roman settlement of Trajectus, which is the Latin word for "bridgehead." It is believed that a settlement around a Roman ford over the River Avon existed somewhere in the vicinity, and the numerous Roman ruins discovered in Keynsham make it a likely candidate for this lost settlement.

In 1877 during construction of the Durley Hill Cemetery, the remains of a grand Roman villa with over 30 rooms was discovered. However, construction of the cemetery went ahead, and the majority of the villa is now located beneath the Victorian cemetery and an adjacent road. The cemetery was expanded in 1922, and an archeological dig was carried out ahead of the interments, leading to the excavation of 17 rooms and the rescue of 10 elaborate mosaics.

At the same time as the grand Roman villa was being excavated at Durley Hill Cemetery, a second smaller villa was discovered during the construction of Fry's Somerdale Chocolate Factory. Two fine stone coffins were found, interred with the remains of a man and a woman. The villa and coffins were removed to a place near the gates of the factory grounds, and construction on the factory went ahead. Fry's built in the grounds of the factory a museum which for many years housed the Durley Hill mosaics, the coffins, and numerous other artefacts. In 2012, Taylor Wimpey, about to develop the factory site, made a detailed geophysical assessment of the area, and discovered an additional 15 Roman buildings centered around a Roman road beneath Keynsham Hams, with evidence of additional Roman buildings that had been disturbed by quarrying.

Medieval Keynsham
According to legend, Saint Keyne, daughter of King Brychan of Brycheiniog (Brecon), lived here on the banks of the River Avon during the 5th century.  Before settling here, she had been warned by the local King that the marshy area was swarming with snakes, which prevented habitation. St Keyne prayed to the heavens and turned the snakes to stone.  The fossil ammonites found in the area were believed to be the result. However, there is no evidence that her cult was ever celebrated in Keynsham.

Some scattered archeological evidence suggests that an Anglo-Saxon settlement existed in Keynsham in the High Street area, and that in the 9th century a Minster church existed in Keynsham as well. The earliest documentary reference to Keynsham is in the Anglo-Saxon Chronicle, (c. 980) which refers to it as Cægineshamme, Old English for 'Cæga's Hamm.' The town is also listed in the Domesday Book of 1086 as "Cainesham." It has therefore been suggested that the origin of Keynsham's name is not, in fact Saint Keyne, but from "Ceagin (Caega)."

Around 1170, Keynsham Abbey was founded by the Victorine congregation of canon regulars. Archeological evidence suggests that the abbey was built over the site of the previous Saxon Minster church. The settlement developed into a medieval market town, and the abbey of Keynsham was given ownership of the Keynsham Hundred.
The Abbey survived until the dissolution of the monasteries in 1539, and a house was subsequently built on the site. The remains have been designated as a Grade I listed building by English Heritage.

Stuart era
Keynsham played a part in the Civil War as the Roundheads saved the town and also camped there for the night, using the pub now known as the Lock Keeper Inn as a guard post. During the Monmouth Rebellion of 1685 the town was the site of a battle between royalist forces and the rebel Duke of Monmouth. Bridges Almshouses were built around 1685 and may have been for the widows of those killed in the rebellion.

Post World War II

Keynsham rose to fame during the late 1950s and early 1960s when it featured in a long-running series of advertisements on Radio Luxembourg for Horace Batchelor's Infra-draw betting system. To obtain the system, listeners had to write to Batchelor's Keynsham post office box, and Keynsham was always painstakingly spelled out on-air, with Batchelor famously intoning "Keynsham – spelt K-E-Y-N-S-H-A-M – Keynsham, Bristol". This was done because the proper pronunciation of Keynsham – "Cane-sham" – does not make the spelling of Keynsham immediately obvious to the radio listener.

Since the 1950s Keynsham has become a dormitory town for Bristol and Bath. The High Street shopping area has been remodelled, and a Town Hall, Library, and Clock Tower were built in the mid-1960s.

Before the creation of Chew Valley Lake and river level controls at Keynsham Lock and weir, Keynsham was prone to flooding. The Great Flood of 1968 inundated large parts of the town, destroying the town's bridges including the county bridge over the Avon which had stood since medieval times, and private premises on Dapps Hill; the devastation was viewed by the Duke of Edinburgh. After the flood the Memorial Park, which had been laid out after World War II was extended.

2010s regeneration
Design work for regeneration of the town hall area was awarded by Bath and North East Somerset Council to Aedas in 2010, with the works cost stated in 2011 to be  ( in 2012). Realisation of the plans is hoped to "attract new business and jobs", in the aftermath of the announcement of the Cadbury Somerdale Factory closure.

In January 2012, it was announced that the Willmott Dixon Group had been appointed as contractor on the scheme. The Council's planning committee in August 2012 deferred the approval decision, pending alterations to the external appearance of the building. These were approved in October 2012, with demolition commencing in the same month. The regenerated Civic Centre area came back into use in late 2014 and early 2015.

In the latter half of the 2010s, Keynsham underwent rapid expansion with hundreds of new homes built.

Governance

The town council has responsibility for local issues, including setting an annual precept (local rate) to cover the council’s operating costs and producing annual accounts for public scrutiny. The town council evaluates local planning applications and works with the local police, district council officers, and neighbourhood watch groups on matters of crime, security, and traffic. The town council's role includes projects for the maintenance and repair of parish facilities, such as the village hall or community centre, as well as consulting with the district council on the maintenance, repair, and improvement of highways, drainage, footpaths, public transport, and street cleaning.

Playing fields and playgrounds are provided in Memorial Park, Downfield, Kelston Road, Teviot Road, Holmoak Road and Manor Road with basketball facilities at Teviot Road and Holmoak Road and a BMX track at Keynsham Road. The Keynsham town council is also responsible for the football pitches and pavilion at Manor Road  and the floodlit Multi Sport Site in Memorial Park. It also provides support for community groups organising music and cultural events. Conservation matters (including trees and listed buildings) and environmental issues are also of interest to the council. The town council was formed in 1991 and consists of 15 members elected every four years. There are  2 Labour and 13 Conservative.  Keynsham has one official twin town: Libourne in France.

From 1974 to 1996, Keynsham was administered as part of the short-lived county of Avon; it has since formed part of the unitary authority of Bath and North East Somerset, in the ceremonial county of Somerset. Bath and North East Somerset which was created in 1996, was established by the Local Government Act 1992. The town is divided into Keynsham North, which has five Conservative councillors, Keynsham South which is represented by three Conservative and two Labour councillors, and Keynsham East, which has the remaining 5 councillors, all of whom are Conservatives.

Bath and North East Somerset provides a single tier of local government with responsibility for almost all local government functions within its area including local planning and building control, local roads, council housing, environmental health, markets and fairs, refuse collection, recycling, cemeteries, crematoria, leisure services, parks, and tourism. It is also responsible for education, social services, libraries, main roads, public transport, trading standards, waste disposal and strategic planning, although fire, police and ambulance services are provided jointly with other authorities through the Avon Fire and Rescue Service, Avon and Somerset Constabulary and the South Western Ambulance Service.

Bath and North East Somerset's area covers part of the ceremonial county of Somerset but it is administered independently of the non-metropolitan county. Its administrative headquarters is in Bath, but many departments are headquartered in Keynsham. Between 1 April 1974 and 1 April 1996, it was the main town of the Wansdyke district of the county of Avon. Before 1974 the parish was part of the Keynsham Urban District.

The parish is represented in the House of Commons of the Parliament of the United Kingdom as part of the North East Somerset constituency, which is a county constituency created by the Boundary Commission for England as the successor seat to the Wansdyke Parliamentary Seat. It came into being at the 2010 general election, and is represented by the Conservative Jacob Rees-Mogg. It elects one Member of Parliament (MP) by the first past the post system of election.

Geography

Keynsham is located where the River Chew meets the River Avon. Fishing rights for the Millground and Chewton sections of the Chew are owned by Keynsham Angling Club. The Mill Ground stretch of the River Chew consists of the six fields on the western bank from Chewton Place at Chewton Keynsham to the Albert Mill. The water is home to chub, roach, European perch and rudd, along with good numbers of gudgeon, dace and trout. Keynsham Lock on the Avon opened in 1727. Just above the lock are some visitor moorings and a pub, on an island between the lock and the weir. The weir side of the island is also the mouth of the River Chew.

Memorial Park, the northern part of which has existed as parkland since the 19th century, as shown by the ordnance Survey maps of 1864 and 1867, was formally laid out after World War II was extended after the floods of 1968. It commemorates the war dead of Keynsham and includes facilities including two children's play areas, a skateboard park, multi-sport area, bowling green, public toilets, a bandstand and refreshment kiosk. The formal gardens within the park are adjacent to the River Chew with the Dapps Hill Woods at its western end. Part of the park is known locally as Chew Park because of its proximity to the river and another area, close to Keynsham Abbey as Abbey Park. The park received the Green Flag Award in 2008/09, and again for 2009/10.

On the outskirts of Keynsham lies Keynsham Humpy Tumps, one of the most floristically rich acidic grassland sites within the Avon area. The site is on a south-facing slope running alongside the Bristol to Bath railway line. It consists of open patches of grassland and bare rock, interspersed with blocks of scrub. It is the only site in Avon at which upright chickweed Moenchia erecta, occurs. Other locally notable plant species found here include annual knawel Scleranthus annuus, sand spurrey Spergularia rubra, subterranean clover Trifolium subterraneus and prickly sedge Carex muricata ssp. lamprocarpa. The site does not have any statutory conservation status, and is not managed for its biodiversity interest. Threats to its ecological value include the encroachment of scrub onto the grassland areas, and damage from motorcycle scrambling. Between Keynsham and Saltford, a  area of green belt has been planted, with over 19,000 trees, as the Manor Road Community Woodland, which has been designated as a Nature Reserve. Nearby is the Avon Valley Country Park tourist attraction.

Along with the rest of South West England, Keynsham has a temperate climate which is generally wetter and milder than the rest of England. The annual mean temperature is about 10 °C (50 °F) with seasonal and diurnal variations, but due to the modifying effect of the sea, the range is less than in most other parts of the United Kingdom. January is the coldest month with mean minimum temperatures between 1 °C (34 °F) and 2 °C (36 °F). July and August are the warmest months in the region with mean daily maxima around 21 °C (70 °F). In general, December is the dullest month and June the sunniest. The south west of England enjoys a favoured location, particularly in summer, when the Azores High extends its influence north-eastwards towards the UK.

Cloud often forms inland, especially near hills, and reduces exposure to sunshine. The average annual sunshine totals around 1600 hours. Rainfall tends to be associated with Atlantic depressions or with convection. In summer, convection caused by solar surface heating sometimes forms shower clouds and a large proportion of the annual precipitation falls from showers and thunderstorms at this time of year. Average rainfall is around 800–900 mm (31–35 in). About 8–15 days of snowfall is typical. November to March have the highest mean wind speeds, with June to August having the lightest. The predominant wind direction is from the south west.

Demography

In the 2001 census Keynsham had a population of 15,533, in 6,545 households, of which 6,480 described themselves as White. Keynsham East Ward had a population of 5,479, Keynsham North 5,035 and Keynsham South 5,019. In each of the wards between 75 and 80% of the population described themselves as Christians, and around 15% said that they had no religion.

In 1881 the population of the civil parish was 2,482. This grew gradually until 1931 when there were 4,521, before there was a steeper rise to 1951 when there were 8,277. Over the next ten years this nearly doubled to 15,152 in 1961.

Economy

An important industry in the town was Cadbury's chocolate factory, the Somerdale Factory. The J. S. Fry & Sons business merged with Cadbury in 1919, and moved their factory in the centre of Bristol to Keynsham in 1935. As Quakers, Cadbury's built the factory on a  greenfield site with social facilities, including playing fields and recreational sports grounds. Called Somerdale after a national competition in 1923, Keynsham Cadbury was the home of Fry's Chocolate Cream, the Double Decker, Dairy Milk and Mini Eggs, Cadbury's Fudge, Chomp and Crunchie.

On 3 October 2007, Cadbury announced plans to close the Somerdale plant by 2010 with the loss of some 500 jobs. Production was to be moved to factories in Birmingham and Poland, and in the longer term it was expected that the site would be redeveloped for housing. Labour MP for Wansdyke, Dan Norris, said "news of the factory's closure is a hard and heavy blow, not just to the workforce, but to the Keynsham community as a whole". By late 2007 campaigns to save the Cadbury's factory in Somerdale were in full swing, and one local resident started a campaign to urge English Heritage to protect the site and preserve the history of the factory.

In 2009 the US corporation Kraft made a takeover bid for Cadbury.  Cadbury's were seen as iconic of British manufacturing industry, and the bid became a cause célèbre of national interest.  To sweeten their case before the Monopolies Commission, Kraft made a pledge to keep the Cadbury factory at Somerdale open if they were successful in their bid for the company; and their bid was duly successful. However, within a week of completing their purchase of Cadbury, Kraft CEO Irene Rosenfeld released a statement announcing that Kraft were to close the factory by 2011, as originally planned by Cadbury. The stated reason for this was that it was only after the purchase had been made that Kraft realised how advanced Cadbury's plans were, but industry experts questioned this, arguing that Kraft invested so much in researching their bid for Cadbury that they should have been aware of the extent to which plans had been advanced.

Culture
In 1969 the town was featured as the title of the fourth album Keynsham by the Bonzo Dog Band. The title was chosen in honour of Horace Batchelor, who had been referenced in previous Bonzo Dog Band recordings. In the early 1960s, Batchelor became known through his regular advertisements on Radio Luxembourg for his football pools prediction service. When giving his contact address, he would slowly spell out 'Keynsham' letter by letter, and this became an amusing feature for many young listeners.

Keynsham Festival, which started in the late 1990s, takes place in the Memorial Park each July, and attracts around 16,000 people.  There is also a Victorian evening held in the town each November. This has since been renamed Keynsham Winter Festival. Keynsham and Saltford local history society was formed in 1965 and is concerned with researching and recording the history of the area.

Keynsham was chosen as the outdoor location for a dramatic story-line in the BBC One TV serial EastEnders in September 2012 with filming taking place in a cordoned-off section of the High Street.

In Northanger Abbey by Jane Austen, Catherine and her friends ride to ″within view of the town of Keynsham″.

Transport

The town is served by Keynsham railway station on the London-Bristol and Bristol-Southampton trunk routes. It opened in 1840 and was renamed Keynsham and Somerdale in 1925. The chocolate factory had its own rail system which was connected to the main line, but the connection was taken out of use 26–27 July 1980. The station's name reverted to Keynsham on 6 May 1974. The station was rebuilt in 1985 as a joint project between British Rail and Avon County Council.

The A4 trunk road used to run through the town, but much of this traffic is now carried on the bypass, which was constructed in 1964.  The bypass runs from Saltford, a village which adjoins Keynsham, to Brislington in Bristol. Keynsham is about 10 miles (16 km) from junction 1 of the M32 via the Avon Ring Road A4174 and provides a fast route to the M4 and M5.

Keynsham is on the Monarch's Way long distance footpath which approximates the escape route taken by King Charles II in 1651 after being defeated in the Battle of Worcester.

In May 2017, the High Street was made one-way for traffic heading towards Saltford and Bath with all Bristol-bound diverted along Ashton Way. There is now no access to Temple Street from High Street with the exception of buses and taxis, all traffic for Temple Street is diverted along Ashton Way.

The town is served by 6 bus routes, 1 of which connects Bath with Bristol International Airport, another bus service runs from Ashton Way at the back of the shops to Southmead Hospital and one bus service runs to Cribbs Causeway. In numerical order:
 A4 Bath to Bristol Airport
 17 Keynsham to Southmead Hospital
 18 Bath to Cribbs Causeway
 39 Bath to Bristol
 178 Radstock to Bristol
 349 Keynsham to Bristol

All buses towards Bristol, Southmead and Cribbs Causeway use the bus stop on Ashton Way at the back of the shops, whilst all buses towards Bath use the stop on the High Street opposite the Post Office.

Education
State-funded schools are organised within the unitary authority of Bath and North East Somerset. A review of Secondary Education in Bath was started in 2007, primarily to reduce surplus provision and reduce the number of single-sex secondary schools in Bath, and to access capital funds available through the government's Building Schools for the Future programme. There are four primary schools in Keynsham, St John’s Primary School, Castle Primary School, Chandag (Infants and Junior schools) and St Keyna Primary School (formed when Keynsham Primary School and 150 year old Temple Primary School merged in 2007). There are also three secondary schools: Wellsway; Broadlands; and IKB Academy.

Wellsway School is an 11–18, mixed comprehensive school which was established in 1971, by amalgamating Keynsham Grammar School and Wellsway County Secondary School both of which opened on a shared site in the mid-1950s. Most students that attend the school live in Keynsham and Saltford or the nearby villages. As of 2014, approximately 1335 students attend the school, ranging in age of 11–18, with 64% achieving 5 or more A-C grades at GCSE. Wellsway's bid for specialist school status was accepted in September 2007. Meaning that Wellsway School now specialises as a Sports and Science College. This means the School has joined the national network of specialist schools, resulting in every school in Bath and North East Somerset now having a specialism. A joint bid is unusual as there are only six schools in the country with a combined Sports and Science specialism.

Broadlands Academy became an academy in 2012. It has 430 students between the ages of 11 and 16 years.

IKB Academy opened in September 2015, and has a focus on Science, Technology, Engineering, and Maths (STEM) subjects. It is a studio school for pupils aged 14–19, and offers GCSEs, A Levels, and BTECs, in conjunction with weekly or fortnightly work placements.

Nearby Bath has two universities. The University of Bath was established in 1966. It is known, academically, for the physical sciences, mathematics, architecture, management and technology. Bath Spa University was first granted degree-awarding powers in 1992 as a university college (Bath Spa University College), before being granted university status in August 2005. It has schools in Art and Design, Education, English and Creative Studies, Historical and Cultural Studies, Music and the Performing Arts, and Social Sciences. The city contains one further education college, City of Bath College, and several sixth forms as part of both state, private, and public schools. In England, on average in 2006, 45.8% of pupils gained 5 grades A-C including English and Maths; for Bath and North East Somerset pupils taking GCSE at 16 it is 52.0%. Special needs education is provided by Three Ways School.

Religious sites

Begun in 1292, the Church of England parish church of St John the Baptist, Keynsham gradually evolved until taking its present general form during the reign of Charles I, after the tower collapsed into the building during a storm in 1632. The tower, built over the north-east corner of the nave, now rises in three stages over the Western entrance and is surmounted by a pierced parapet and short crocketted pinnacles and is said to have been built from the ruins of the abbey church. The south aisle and south porch date from 1390. The chancel, then the responsibility of the abbey, was rebuilt in 1470 and further restoration was carried out in 1634–1655, following the collapse of the tower. There is a pulpit dating from 1634 and is also a screen of the same age which shuts off the choir vestry. It has been designated as a Grade II* listed building.

A former organ is said to have stood in the church, but "had tones so mellow" that Handel bargained for it, offering a peal of bells in exchange. The offer was accepted. The musician went off with the organ and the bells were delivered. There are eight bells in total, some made by the Bilbie family of Chew Stoke, the smallest bears these lines:
"I value not who doth me see
For Thomas Bilbie casted me;
Althow my sound it is but small
I can be heard amongst you all."

St John the Baptist church is one of five churches in the Church of England Parish of Keynsham, the others being the village churches of St Michael's in Burnett and St Margaret's in Queen Charlton, the "Mission Church" in Chewton Keynsham (formerly the school building), and St Francis' Church on the Park Estate which in 2013 - 2015 underwent extensive modernisation and offers two halls for use by community groups.

There are also the Victoria and Queens Road Methodist churches, St Dunstan's Roman Catholic Church and an Elim Church.  The churches work together, also with churches in Saltford, under the banner of "Churches Together in Keynsham and Saltford" and often with the strapline "More to Life".

Sport

Keynsham Cricket Club play at the Frank Taylor Memorial Ground, their 1st XI compete in the West of England Premier League Division 2. Marcus Trescothick is the most noticeable player to have played for the club. His family remain members of the club, which incorporates over 100 senior members and 100 junior members.

Keynsham rugby football club play at Crown Field. The club's most notable and tragic event occurred on 24 December 1992, when there was a fatal road accident outside the club's ground. A Ford Fiesta car ploughed into 11 people leaving the annual festive disco. One woman, 21-year-old Sarah Monnelle, died at the scene. A second person, 24-year-old rugby player Richard Barnett, died in hospital two days later from his injuries. Clive Sutton was later found guilty on a double charge of causing death by dangerous driving and sentenced to four years in prison at Bristol Crown Court.

Keynsham Town F.C. were founded in 1895. They have played continuously apart from a break during World War II and moved to their current ground, the Crown Field, in 1945. They first played in the Bristol & District League and progressed through the Bristol Combination, Bristol Premier and Somerset Senior League and won the Somerset Senior Cup in 1951–52 and 1957–58. They were elected to the Western League in 1973 but were relegated three years later in 1976. Since then they have been promoted to the Premier Division three times and relegated three times. They won the Somerset Senior Cup for the third time in 2002–03 and reached the 5th round of the FA Vase in 2003–04. They currently play in the Western Football League Division 1.

There is a bowls club situated at the Memorial Park. The Fry Tennis Club has courts located within the town's Somerdale estate. Keynsham leisure centre was built in 1965 by British Gas as a gift to the town. It includes a swimming pool, gymnasium and sauna.

Notable residents
Several notable people have been born or lived in Keynsham. The comedian Bill Bailey was raised in the town. Another entertainer Neil Forrester, who was a research assistant and became known as a cast member on The Real World: London was also a local. Celebrated children's author Mimi Thebo has been resident since 2002. Sports players from Keynsham include Mark Regan a professional rugby player and a former player at Keynsham Rugby Football Club, Luke Sutton of Lancashire County Cricket Club who played as both a wicket-keeper and batsman, Marcus Trescothick, the Somerset and England cricketer. and Judd Trump, a professional snooker player.
Horace Batchelor, who sold a system for the football pools, lived in Keynsham, making the town famous by spelling its name in his regular advertisements on Radio Luxembourg.

References

External links

 Keynsham Town Council
 
Wherearoundme.co.uk local businesses

 Keynsham Leisure Centre

 
Towns in Bath and North East Somerset
Civil parishes in Somerset
Market towns in Somerset